This is a list of Hindi channels in Europe. (Updates In April 2020)

General entertainment
Colors
Colors Rishtey
Sony SAB
Sony TV
STAR Bharat
STAR Plus
Zee TV

Movies
B4U Movies
Colors Cineplex
Sony Max
Sony Max 2
STAR Gold
Zee Cinema

Music
B4U Music
MTV India

News
Aaj Tak
NDTV 24x7
NDTV India

Religious
Aastha Bhajan
Aastha TV
Ahsas TV
Davi TV
Muslim Television Ahmadiyya
Peace TV
Sikh Channel

Selection Europe Only Channel/Yupp TV Exclusive
ABP Asmita
ABP Live
ABP News
Zee Aflam
Zee Bangla
Zee Jagran
Zee News
Zee One
ZeeQ
Zee Russia
Zee Tamil
Zee World

Indian Government channels
DD Bharati
DD Cinema
DD India ( on 2 January 2009 on SKY Digital)
DD International
DD Kids
DD Kisan
DD National
DD News ( on 2 January 2009 on SKY Digital)
DD North East
DD Sports

Hindi channels provider

Hindi
Europe
Television channels in Europe